The Twentieth Texas Legislature met from January 11 to April 4, 1887 in regular session, and from April 16 to May 15, 1888 in a called session. All members of the House of Representatives and a portion of the members of the Senate were elected in the 1886 General Election.

Sessions
 20th Regular session: January 11, 1887 – April 4, 1887
 20th First called session: April 16, 1888 – May 15, 1888

Party summary

House of Representatives

Officers

Senate
 Lieutenant Governor: Thomas Benton Wheeler, Democrat
 President pro tempore:
 William Henry Pope, Democrat, Regular session
 Caleb J. Garrison, Democrat, Regular session
 John Woods, Democrat, First called session

House of Representatives
 Speaker of the House: George C. Pendleton, Democrat

 Source material was unclear in which order the two Presidents pro tempore served.

Members
Members of the Twentieth Texas Legislature as of the beginning of the Regular Session, January 11, 1887:

Senate

House of Representatives

 Source material was unclear in which order the representatives served or if they served concurrently.

Membership changes

Senate

  District 22: Baker elected in special election June 4, 1887.

House of Representatives

  District 45: Special election held June 4, 1887, Joel W. Booth declared winner and sworn in at beginning of First called session.

External links

20th Texas Legislature
1887 in Texas
1888 in Texas
1887 U.S. legislative sessions
1888 U.S. legislative sessions